The Tennessee Volunteers women's golf team represents the University of Tennessee located in Knoxville, Tennessee. The Vols compete at the Division I level of the National Collegiate Athletic Association (NCAA) and the Southeastern Conference (SEC). The Vols currently rotate between 16 different golf courses located in the state of Tennessee. The current coach for the Lady Volunteer's is Diana Cantu who began in 2022. Until the 2022 season, the Lady Vols had appeared in an NCAA regional every year since the program began in 1993, and they were one of only 9 NCAA Division 1 teams to compete in every NCAA regional since the championship’s format was established.

History 
Despite the SEC beginning to sponsor women's golf in 1980-81, Tennessee did not sponsor the sport at the varsity level for 12 more years until 1992-93. The Lady Vols were the last team in the SEC to begin play except for Arkansas who had their first season in time for the 1995-96 season. All-time the Lady Vols are tied for 6th in the SEC (with Texas A&M and Alabama) for most appearances (14) in the NCAA Championships behind Florida, Georgia, South Carolina, Auburn, and LSU. Their best finish nationally came at the 2000 and 2015 NCAA Championships where both teams finished 5th overall. The program is one of only two at Tennessee (the other being women's tennis) to never win a conference title. The Lady Vols have finished 2nd three times at the SEC Championships (1993, 1999, 2006), and won two NCAA Regionals. They were one of only 9 nationwide to qualify for every NCAA Regional until they failed to do so in the 2022 season. Additionally, the women's golf team posted winning seasons each year from inception until 2013-14, and have only had 5 losing seasons ever.

Judi Pavón era 
Judi Pavón took over the helm of the Lady Vol golf team in 2000. She has led the team to 18 straight NCAA regional appearances and 11 appearances in the NCAA Championships. From (2004-2007) Pavón lead the Lady Vols to the final rounds of the NCAA Championships. One of the best seasons in program history was in 2005 when they won the 2005 NCAA West regional and finished 6th at the NCAA Championships. In the 2006 season they won the NCAA East regional and finshied tied for 13th at the NCAA Championships. The Lady Vols had another record setting season in 2015, when they finished 5th at the NCAA tournament tying a program record. They would return to the NCAA Championships in 2016 and in 2019. Pavon retired and was replaced by former Maryland head coach and lady-vol player from 2006-2010, Diana Cantú.

Diana Cantú era 
Before coming to Tennessee, Cantú served as head coach of the Maryland Terrapins for seven seasons. There, she earned Big 10 coach of the year honors after taking the Terrapins to their best ever finish at the Big 10 Championships (2nd) and their first ever NCAA Championship appearance in 2021. In her first season as head coach (2021-2022), the Lady Vols struggled to a 41-95-2 record and an 8th place SEC finish. Despite advancing to match play for the first time at SECs, the year ended with the Lady Vols failing to qualify for NCAA Regionals for the first time in program history.

Yearly record
Sources

*Note: The 2019–20 season was suspended in mid-March 2020 and later canceled due to the coronavirus (COVID-19) global health crisis.

National honors 
Throughout the history of the Lady Vols golf program, 13 golfers have earned 29 All-America honors.

WGCA All-Americans 
Abby Pearson – 1993
Katharina Larsson – 1994
Erin Kurczewski – 1998
Young-A Yang – 1999, 2000, 2001, and 2002
Violeta Retamoza – 2003 and 2005
Jessica Shepley – 2004
Marci Turner – 2006 and 2007
Nicole Smith – 2006
Nathalie Mansson – 2010
Erica Popson – 2011 and 2013
AJ Newell – 2015
Anna Newell – 2015 and 2016

Golf Week All-Americans 
Nicole Smith – 2007
Marci Turner – 2008
Nathalie Mansson – 2009 and 2010
Erica Popson – 2011 and 2013
Lucia Polo – 2015
Anna Newell – 2016

Individual honors 
32 Lady Vols have garnered All-SEC honors throughout the women's golf history including two SEC Player of The Year awards and three Freshman of The Year awards.

SEC Player of The Year 
Katharina Larsson – 1994
Violeta Retamoza – 2005

SEC Freshman of The Year 
Abby Pearson – 1993
Young-A Yang – 1999
Violeta Retamoza – 2003

Mack and Jonnie Day Golf Facility 

Although the Vols men’s and women’s golf teams host their home matches at a variety of different courses in the state of Tennessee they have recently welcomed a new state of the art practice facility on campus where the team can practice all year round. The practice facility resides on a 28-acre lot across from the University's Medical Center and contains a 3-hole course plus putting green. The new facility opened in 2010 and was finished in 2019 with the Blackburn-Furrow Golf Clubhouse. The 8,300 square foot clubhouse features offices for both the men and women's teams, heated hitting bays for year-round practice, video training space, locker rooms, team lounges, over 1,200 square feet of outdoor deck spaces, and a virtual-putting green.

See also 

Tennessee Volunteers
Tennessee Volunteers men's golf

References

External links 
 SECSports.com – Official website of the Southeastern Conference.